Max D. Raiskin (Hebrew: מרדכי רייסקין, June 3, 1919, New York City – December 29, 1978, Tel Aviv, Israel), was a rabbi, Professor of Hebrew Literature, licensed Certified Public Accountant, author of educational textbooks, and  the principal and executive director of the East Side Hebrew Institute.

Life and work
Max Raiskin was born in New York City on June 3, 1919 to Louis (Leib) and Anna (Henia) Raiskin, immigrants from Russia. The Middle initial of his name (the letter D) stands for his mother's maiden name, Dubnoff. In December 1947, the principal of the East Side Hebrew Institute, David R. Zaslowsky, died, and Raiskin was asked by the board to take over the school. Aside from that he was a well-known educator in NYC. His stated goal was to bring Jews closer to Judaism, with the motto that "Every Jewish  child deserves a Jewish education". He was the firstin the U.S. to initiate and establish a program for preparing mentally challenged and blind children for their Bar Mitzvah. He also established the program for the master's degree in Modern Hebrew Literature at Brooklyn College in the early 1950s. Rabbi Raiskin authored several educational books, edited a multitude of others (uncredited), and was Ktav Publishing's educational advisor.
In 1974 Rabbi Raiskin emigrated to Israel with his wife and eight children, where he died in 1978.

In 1981, the 6th street Synagogue and community center in New York City, where many of his students were members, was named in his honor "The Rabbi Max D. Raiskin Center". In 1997, one of his former students, actor Paul Reiser, named a Day School after him in Los Angeles, following his educational philosophy.

Bibliography

Books
 Sefer Ha'avot I : Haver LaHistoria (1954)
 Torati (1956)
 Chumashi I: Genesis (1956)
 Chumashi I (Color Edition) (1956-1957)
 Chumashi II: With Rashi Readings (1959)
 Sefer Ha'avot I Targilon (Workbook) (1960)
 Sefer Ha'avot II : Toledot Hashvatim (1965)
 Sefer Ha'avot II Workbook (1967)
 Mitzvot and Values (1977)
 Mishnah Tractate Ta'anit with the commentary of Rabbi Ovadya of Bartinura : translated into English, punctuated and annotated (1996)

References

1919 births
Brooklyn College faculty
Hunter College faculty
American Modern Orthodox rabbis
American accountants
American emigrants to Israel
1978 deaths
20th-century American rabbis